Several popes have been named Martin (in Latin, Martinus):

Pope Martin I
Pope Martin II (Pope Marinus I)
Pope Martin III (Pope Marinus II)
Pope Martin IV
Pope Martin V

See also
Pope Marinus (disambiguation), to explain the occurrences  of the Marinus name above

Martin